Benton J. Campbell is an American lawyer. He was interim United States Attorney for the Eastern District of New York from 2007 to 2010, and, was a partner at Latham & Watkins, a New York City law firm. He is now General Counsel of Deloitte.

Campbell was raised in Iowa.  He did his undergraduate studies at Yale University and then attended the University of Chicago Law School.

References

External links
United States Attorney's Office for the Eastern District of New York: Former United States Attorneys, November 7, 2014

Yale University alumni
University of Chicago Law School alumni
United States Attorneys for the Eastern District of New York
Living people
New York (state) lawyers
Year of birth missing (living people)